Duffry Rovers GAA  is a Gaelic Athletic Association club located in the centre of Ballindaggin, Caim and Kiltealy villages in County Wexford, Ireland. The club fields teams in Gaelic football, hurling and camogie.

Honours
 Wexford Senior Football Championship (8): 
 1986, 1987, 1988, 1989, 1990, 1991, 1992, 1994
 Wexford Intermediate Football Championship (1)
 1980
 Wexford Intermediate A Football Championships: (1)
 2016
 Wexford Intermediate Hurling Championships: (2)
 1969, 1978
 Wexford Junior Football Championships: (1)
 1977
 Wexford Under-21 Football Championships: (5)
 1979 (with Marshalstown), 1987, 1988, 1989, 1990
 Wexford Under-21 Hurling Championships: (6)
 1970 (with Rathnure), 1971 (with Rathnure), 1976 (with Marshalstown), 1978 (with Marshalstown), 1979 (with Marshalstown), 1980 (with Marshalstown), 1981 (with Marshalstown)
 Wexford Minor Football Championships: (1)
 1978 (with Marshalstown)
 Wexford Minor Hurling Championships: (3)
 1973 (with Rathnure), 1978 (with Marshalstown), 1991

Notable players
 Damien Fitzhenry

References

Gaelic games clubs in County Wexford
Hurling clubs in County Wexford
Gaelic football clubs in County Wexford